Kirill Pavlyuchek  (born 27 June 1984) is a Belarusian former professional footballer.

Career
Pavlyuchek has been called one of the most promising defenders in Belarusian football, and made his debut with the Belarus national football team during 2008 at the Malta International Tournament.

Honours
Dinamo Minsk
Belarusian Premier League champion: 2004
Belarusian Cup winner: 2002–03

Gomel
Belarusian Cup winner: 2010–11

Minsk
Belarusian Cup winner: 2012–13

Zimbru Chișinău
Moldovan Cup winner: 2013–14
Moldovan Super Cup winner: 2014

Career stats

References

External links
 
 
 
 Profile at FC Zimbru website 

1984 births
Living people
Belarusian footballers
Belarusian expatriate footballers
Expatriate footballers in Russia
Expatriate footballers in Moldova
Belarus international footballers
Association football defenders
FC Luch Vladivostok players
Russian Premier League players
FC Dinamo Minsk players
FC Neman Grodno players
FC Gomel players
FC Minsk players
FC Dnepr Mogilev players
FC Zimbru Chișinău players
FC Gorodeya players
FC Slavia Mozyr players
FC Smorgon players
FC Krumkachy Minsk players